The Penny Crane Award for Distinguished Service is an award issued by the Association for Computing Machinery's Special Interest Group on University and College Computing Services. It was established in 2000 to recognise individuals who have made significant contributions to the Special Interest Group, and to computing in higher education.

Recipients
Source: ACM

2019   Kelly Wainwright
2018   Nancy Bauer
2017   Tim Foley
2016   Phil Isensee
2015   Bob Haring-Smith
2014   Cynthia Dooling
2013   Terris Wolff
2012   No Recipient
2011   Leila Lyonsi
2010   Lida Larsen
2009   Robert Paterson
2008   Jerry Smith
2007   Dennis Mar
2006   Jennifer Fajman 	
2005   J. Michael Yohe
2004   Linda Hutchison
2003   Russell Vaught
2002   John Bucher
2001   John H. (Jack) Esbin  	
2000   Jane Caviness

See also
 See Qualifications and Nominations page, at the ACM SIGUCCS Web Page.
 Penny Crane Award Web Page at ACM/SIGUCCS
 Penny Crane memory book
 List of computer science awards

References

Association for Computing Machinery
Awards established in 2000
Computer science awards
Distinguished service awards
Education awards